All About H. Hatterr (1948) is a novel by G. V. Desani chronicling the adventures of an Anglo-Malay man in search of wisdom and enlightenment. "As far back as in 1951," Desani later wrote, "I said H. Hatterr was a portrait of a man, the common vulgar species, found everywhere, both in the East and in the West".

Literary significance and reception
Salman Rushdie comments:

The mad English of All About H. Hatterr is a thoroughly self-conscious and finely controlled performance, as Anthony Burgess points out in its preface:

Comments Amardeep Singh, Assistant Professor of English at Lehigh University on the novel's mad English:

The novel appeared in The Telegraph's 2014 list of the 10 all-time greatest Asian novels.

Footnotes

External links
In Praise of "Balderdash" (And other words for "nonsense") by Amardeep Singh, Assistant Professor of English at Lehigh University - a blog
www.desani.org

1948 British novels